Rodney Street is a street in Admiralty East, Central and Western District, Hong Kong. It connects with Queensway in the south and Harcourt Road in the north.

Namesake
The name Rodney Street comes from HMS Rodney as Admiralty was once the Naval Dockyard Admiralty Dock, the headquarters of British Navy in Hong Kong. Rodney comes from Baron Rodney, in which the famous is George Brydges Rodney, 1st Baron Rodney in the 18th century.

Nearby Sights
 United Centre
 Admiralty Centre
 Queensway
 Harcourt Road
 Harcourt Garden

Transport
 Admiralty (East) Public Transport Interchange
 Admiralty (Rodney Street) Bus Terminus
 Admiralty station (MTR)

References

Admiralty, Hong Kong
Roads on Hong Kong Island